Yui Kamiji and Jordanne Whiley defeated the defending champions Jiske Griffioen and Aniek Van Koot in the final, 6–4, 3–6, 6–3 to win the women's doubles wheelchair tennis title at the 2014 US Open. With the win, they completed the Grand Slam, and each completed the career Grand Slam.

Seeds
 Yui Kamiji /  Jordanne Whiley (Winner)
 Jiske Griffioen /  Aniek van Koot (final)

Doubles

Bracket

References

Draw

Wheelchair Women's Doubles
U.S. Open, 2014 Women's Doubles